Amelia Lópes O'Neill is a 1991 Chilean drama film directed by Valeria Sarmiento. It was entered into the 41st Berlin International Film Festival.

Plot 
Since their father's death, Amelia and her sister Ana have been living in a house overlooking the port of Valparaíso. They both fall in love with the same man, Fernando. Amelia meets him first, then it is Ana's turn, who eventually marries him. This epic drama, set in Chile between the two World Wars, is narrated by a magician thief who is devastated by his love for Amelia.

Cast
 Franco Nero as Fernando
 Laura del Sol as Amelia Lópes O'Neil
 Laura Benson as Anna
 Valérie Mairesse as Ginette
 Sergio Hernández as Igor
 Jaime Vadell as L'avocat
 Claudia Di Girolamo as La femme de Fernando
 Carla Cristi as La bonne
 Roberto Navarrete as Le journaliste

References

External links

1991 films
1990s Spanish-language films
1991 drama films
Films directed by Valeria Sarmiento
Chilean drama films